The Politburo of the Central Committee of the People's Democratic Party of Afghanistan (PDPA) or Afghan Politburo was the policy-making organ and institution within the Afghanistan's political structure when the PDPA Central Committee and the PDPA Congress were not in session. Only one politburos was formally elected; at the 1st Congress, despite this, the membership line-up was altered numerous times during the PDPA's existence.

Historical line-up

1st Politburo
Full members
 Nur Mohammed Taraki (General Secretary)
 Babrak Karmal (Deputy General Secretary)
 Sultan Ali Keshtmand
 Saleh Mohamed Zeary
 Gholam Destaguir Panjsheri
 Tahir Badakhshi
 Charoullah Chapour
Candidate members
 Nur Ahmed Nur
 Dr. Akbar Chah-Wali
 Abdoul Karil Missaq
 Suleiman Laeq
 Mohammad Hasan Bareq
 Hafizullah Amin
 Ismaïl Danesh
 Abdul Hakim Charayi Jowzjani
 Abdul Majid
 Zaher Ofoq Qandahari
 Dr. Zaher

Poltiburo members (1984) 
By 1984, eight of the thirteen members and alternate members of the Politburo were Parchamis:
Members of the Parcham faction
Babrak Karmal
Sultan Ali Keshtmand
Mohammad Najibullah
Nur Ahmed Nur
Mohammad Rafie
Anahita Ratebzad
Members of the Khalq faction
Abdul Qadir
Mahmud Baryalai
Mohammad Aslam Watanjar
Salih Muhammad Zeary
Muhammad Ismail Danesh
Unclear
Ghulam Dastagir Panjsheri (believed to be in Kar)
Abdul Zahoor Razmjo

References 

Democratic Republic of Afghanistan
Afghanistan
People's Democratic Party of Afghanistan